Martin Kukučín (real name Matej Bencúr, 17 May 1860, Jasenová, Croatia – 21 May 1928) was a Slovak prose writer, dramatist and publicist. He was the most notable representative of Slovak literary realism, and is considered one of the founders of modern Slovak prose.

Biography

He was born into a family of freemen, or soltys,  the son of Ján Bencúr Juriš and his wife Zuzana, née Pašková, and had two brothers and one sister. He was educated at the Slovak 'gymnasium' in Revúca, Martin, Banská Bystrica, Kežmarok, and finished his education in Sopron. Although he wished to study theology in Bratislava, due to the anti-Slovak atmosphere prevailing at that time, he chose to study medicine in Prague instead.

After graduating and completing his internship in Bratislava, Innsbruck and Vienna, he attempted without success to find employment in Slovakia. Instead in 1893 he began to work as a doctor in the village of Selca on the island of Brač in Croatia, where he was also an active member of the cultural society Hrvatski Sastanak. In 1904, he became one of its directors. In 1896–97, he tried unsuccessfully to return to Slovakia.

In 1904, he married Perica Didolić, with whom he left in 1908 for South America, where they settled in Punta Arenas, Chile, where there was a large community of Croatian émigrés. During 1922–24, he lived again in Slovakia (Czechoslovakia at that time), then moved to Croatia in 1924–25, briefly returning to Chile in 1925 to resolve property disputes. In 1926, he finally settled in Lipik, a spa town in Croatia, where he died in 1928. Temporarily buried in Zagreb, he was interred in the National Cemetery in Martin in October 1928.

On May 17, 2010, Google Doodle commemorated Martin Kukucin's 150th birthday.

Works

Prose
 1883 - Na hradskej ceste
 1885 - Rysavá jalovica
 1886 - Neprebudený
 1890 - Keď báčik z Chocholova umrie
 1891 - Na podkonickom bále
 1892 - Koniec a začiatok
 1892 - Dve cesty
 1893 - Dies Irae
 1898 - V Dalmácii a Čiernej Hore, travelogue
 1899 - Hody
 1911 / 1912 - Dom v stráni, novel set in Brač
 1922 - Črty z ciest. Prechádzky po Patagónii, travelogue
 1922 - Mladé letá, memoirs about his student years
 1926 - Mať volá, novel about Croatian emigrants in Chile
 1929 - Bohumil Valizlosť Zábor, historical novel
 1929 - Lukáš Blahosej Krasoň, historical novel
 1930 - Košútky. Klbká. Rozmarínový mládnik.
 Čas tratí - čas platí
 Máje, poviedka
 Pán majster Obšíval
 Na jarmok
 Na Ondreja, 
 Hajtman, poviedka
 Obecné trampoty
 Z teplého hniezda
 Veľkou lyžicou
 Panský hájnik
 O Michale
 Na svitaní
 Ako sa kopú poklady
 Pozor na čižmy
 Sviatočné dumy
 Tri roje cez deň
 Svadba
 Parník
 Štedrý deň

Drama 
 1907 - Komasácia
 1922 - Bacuchovie dvor
 1924 - Obeta

See also
 Martin Kukučín (sculpture)

References

External links 

 Kukučín, Martin: Keď báčik z Chocholova umrie on-line book in Slovak
 Kukučín, Martin: Neprebudený on-line book in Slovak
 Kukučín, Martin: Tichá voda on-line book in Slovak
 Kukučín, Martin: Veľkou lyžicou on-line book in Slovak
 Martin Kukučín on the Slovak Radio webpage 
 Martin Kukučín 
 Na podkonickom bále Slovak online PDF book
 Keď báčik z Chochoľova umrie Slovak online PDF book
 Regrúti Slovak online PDF book
 Dies irae (Dni hnevu) Slovak online PDF book

1860 births
1928 deaths
People from Dolný Kubín District
Slovak writers
19th-century Slovak people
20th-century Slovak people
Slovak expatriates in Austria
Burials at National Cemetery in Martin